This is a partial list of islands of the Midwestern United States.

States

Illinois

Bardwell Island
Big Blue Island
Campbell's Island
Carroll Island
Chouteau Island

Dillon Island
Goose Island
Isle a la Cache 
Kaskaskia Island
Long Island

McEvers Island
Mosenthein Island
Rock Island Arsenal
Stolp Island
Treat Island
Tully Island

Indiana

Beeler
Biddle
Big (Fulton County)
Big (Noble County)
Bishop
Bois

Block
Brown
Greathouse
Holmes
Island Park

Monkey
Morrison
Ribeyre
Sevenmile

Iowa
Beaver Island, Clinton County, Iowa
 Chaplain Schmitt Memorial Island, in the Mississippi River, in Dubuque, Iowa
Credit Island, in the Mississippi River, in Davenport, Iowa
Sabula, Iowa, the site of Iowa's only island city

Kansas

Ackerman Island, former island in Wichita
Franks Island
Kickapoo Island - historical
Nelson Island
Stigers Island

Michigan

Amygdaloid Island, part of Isle Royale National Park
Beaver Island, inhabited island in Lake Michigan
Beaver Island, small island in Lake Superior
Belle Isle, city park in Detroit in the Detroit River
Bois Blanc Island, inhabited island in Lake Huron
Calf Island, part of Detroit River International Wildlife Refuge
Charity Island, in Saginaw Bay, Lake Huron
Cherry Island, Potagannissing Bay at the south end of the St. Marys River
Copper Island, tip of Keweenaw Peninsula
Crooked Island, Lake Huron
Crow Island, in Saginaw River, site of Crow Island State Game Area
Diamond Island, in Diamond Lake (Michigan)
Drummond Island, inhabited island in Lake Huron
Frying Pan Island, St. Marys River, had lighthouse
Garden Island Lake Michigan
Gard Island, Lake Erie, owned by University of Toledo
Gull Island, any of a dozen small islands
Grand Island, location of Grand Island National Recreation Area
Granite Island, site of lighthouse in Lake Superior
Grassy Island, part of Detroit River International Wildlife Refuge
Grosse Ile, inhabited island in Detroit River
Harbor Island National Wildlife Refuge 
Harsens Island, inhabited island in Lake St. Clair
Hickory Island, southern end of Grosse Ile
Higgins Island, 
High Island, Lake Michigan
Hog Island, Lake Michigan
Horse Island, Lake Erie, near Gibraltar
Huron Islands, Lake Superior, has lighthouse
Indian Island, Lake Erie
Ile Aux Galets, Lake Michigan, location of Skillagalee Lighthouse
Isle Royale, location of Isle Royale National Park in Lake Superior
Katechay Island, in Saginaw Bay, Lake Huron
Les Cheneaux Islands, group of 36 inhabited islands in Lake Huron
Lime Island, in St. Marys River
Little Charity Island, in Saginaw Bay, Lake Huron
Little Summer Island, Lake Michigan
Long Island
Mackinac Island, inhabited island in Lake Huron
Manitou Island, Lake Superior, site of lighthouse
Marquette Island, Lake Huron, one of the Le Cheneaux group
Michigan Islands National Wildlife Reserve
Middle Island, Lake Huron
Mud Island, part of Detroit River International Wildlife Refuge
Naubinway Island, Lake Michigan, site of lighthouse
Neebish Island, inhabited island in St. Marys River
North Island, Saginaw Bay, Lake Huron
North Cape, in Lake Erie
North Fox Island, state-owned island in Lake Michigan
North Manitou Island, part of Sleeping Bear Dunes National Lakeshore
Ojibway Island, in Saginaw River
Passage Island, Isle Royale National Park, has lighthouse 
Peach Isle, in Detroit River, site of Peach Isle Range Lighthouse
Pipe Island, St. Marys River, had lighthouse
Poverty Island, Lake Michigan
Power Island, also called Ford Island and Marion Island, a Grand Traverse County park 
Round Island, Chippewa County, in Lake Superior, has lighthouse
Round Island, Chippewa County, in St. Marys River, has lighthouse
Round Island, Alpena County, in Lake Huron, site of lighthouse
Round Island, Delta County, in Green Bay in Lake Michigan
Round Island, Delta County, in Big Bay De Noc in Lake Michigan
Round Island, Keweenaw County, off Isle Royale in Lake Superior
Round Island, Mackinac County, off Mackinac Island in Lake Huron, has lighthouse
Round Island, Presque Isle County, in Grand Lake
Round Island, Wayne County, at southern tip of Grosse Ile in Lake Erie
St. Helena Island, Lake Michigan, site of lighthouse
St. Martin Island, Lake Michigan, has lighthouse
South Island, Saginaw Bay, Lake Huron
South Fox Island inhabited island in Lake Michigan
South Manitou Island, part of Sleeping Bear Dunes National Lakeshore
Stoney Point Island, Lake Erie
Squaw Island, Lake Michigan 
Sugar Island, inhabited, includes part of Bay Mills Indian Reservation
Summer Island, Lake Michigan
Thunder Bay Island, Lake Huron, site of lighthouse
Trout Island, Lake Michigan
Turtle Island, Lake Erie
Whiskey Island, Lake Michigan
Washington Island, part of Isle Royale National Park
Waugoshance Island, Lake Michigan
Zug Island, part of Ford Motor Company's River Rouge Plant

Minnesota

Aeroplane Island
Aikio Island
Alepo Island
Anderson Island
Angel Island
Babe Island (Minnesota)
Baileys Island
Bakers Island
Baldwin Island
Banfill Island (?)
Banfills Island (?)
Barrett Island
Bear Island
Big Island, Lake Minnetonka
Boom Island - historical
Campers Island (Minnesota)
Coney Island, Lake Waconia
Crane Island
Deering Island, Lake Minnetonka
Eagle Island, Lake Minnetonka
Enchanted Island, Lake Minnetonka
Goose Island, Lake Minnetonka
Gale's Island, Lake Minnetonka
Grey Cloud Island
Harriet Island - historical
Hennepin Island - historical
Latsch Island
Manitou Island
Nicollet Island
Oak Island
Pike Island
Peacebunny Island, Mississippi River
Raspberry Island, Mississippi River
Ripple Island (Minnesota), an island in Shagawa Lake
Shady Island, Lake Minnetonka
Spirit Island, Lake Minnetonka
Spray Island, Lake Minnetonka
Star Island, the island containing Lake Windigo
Wawatasso Island, Lake Minnetonka (Boy Scout)

Missouri
Missouri River Islands
Bonhomme Island
Catfish Island
Howell Island
Johnson Island
Pelican Island

Mississippi River Islands
Angle Island
Apple Island
Bolter Island
Cuivre Island
Dardenne Island
Dresser Island
Ellis Island
Gilbert Island
Grand Tower Island
Maple Island
Mason Island
Moser Island
Peruque Island
Pharrs Island
Portage Island
Tower Rock
Two Branch Island
Westport Island

Osage River Islands
Bell Island
Cotton Island
Hawaiian Island

Nebraska
Goat Island (On the Missouri River, between Vermillion, SD, and Yankton, SD.)

North Dakota

 Grahams Island
 Gros Ventres Island (historical)

Ohio

Ballast Island
Bass Islands
Middle Bass Island
Sugar Island (lies northwest of Middle Bass Island)
North Bass Island
South Bass Island
Buckeye Island
Gibraltar Island
Green Island
Gull Island (former)
Johnson's Island
Kafralu Island
Kelleys Island
Lost Ballast Island
Mouse Island
Rattlesnake Island
Starve Island
Turtle Island
West Sister Island

South Dakota
Goat Island (part)

Wisconsin

Apostle Islands
Basswood Island
Bear Island
Devils Island
Cat Island
Eagle Island
Gull Island
Hermit Island
Ironwood Island
Long Island
Madeline Island, contains the Town of La Pointe (population 250)
Manitou Island
Michigan Island
North Twin Island
Oak Island
Otter Island
Outer Island
Raspberry Island
Rocky Island
Sand Island
South Twin Island
Stockton Island
York Island
Adventure Island
The Ansul Islands
Baker's Island
Barker's Island 
Bergmann Island
Brunet Island (part of a State Park)
Cana Island
Chambers Island
Detroit Island
Doty Island
Duck Island
Fish Island
French Island, contains the Town of Campbell (population 4,410)
Gravel Island
Green Island
Hat Island
Hog Island
Horseshoe Island
Jones Island, Milwaukee
Pilot Island
Plum Island
Rock Island
The Sister Islands
Spider Island
The Strawberry Islands
Sugar Island
Washington Island, contains the Town of Washington (population 660)
Willow Island (Wisconsin)

See also 
Islands of the Great Lakes
List of islands of the United States

Midwest